Crambus richteri is a moth of the family Crambidae. It is found in Ethiopia.

Externally this species is very similar to Crambus archimedes from South Africa and the author did not exclude that it is a geographical subspecies of same.

References

Endemic fauna of Ethiopia
Crambini
Moths of Africa
Moths described in 1963